Nalasopara Assembly constituency is one of the 288 Vidhan Sabha (legislative assembly) constituencies of Maharashtra state, western India. This constituency is located in Palghar district.

Geographical scope
The constituency comprises parts of Vasai taluka viz. revenue circles Virar and Vasai-Virar Municipal Corporation.

Members of Legislative Assembly

Election results

2019 results

2014 results

2009 results

References

Assembly constituencies of Palghar district
Assembly constituencies of Maharashtra